Dib (in Arabic ديب or ذيب) is given name and surname. It may refer to:

People with the given name
Dib Williams (1910–1992), American baseball player, second baseman

People with the surname
Alexandre Dib (born 1929), Brazilian boxer
Billel Dib (born 1989), Australian boxer
Billy Dib, born Bilal Dib (born 1985) Australian boxer
Hikmat Dib, Lebanese politician
Jihad Dib (born 1973), Australian politician who was elected at the 2015 New South Wales state election to the Legislative Assembly
Marcel Dib (born 1960), French football (soccer) player
Mohammed Dib, (1920–2003), Algerian author
Pietro Dib (1881–1965), Maronite bishop of the Maronite Catholic Eparchy of Cairo

See also
DIB (disambiguation)
Diab (disambiguation)
Deeb, variant of Dib as a surname